Bob Crowley  (born 10 June 1952) is a theatre designer (scenic and costume), and theatre director.  He lives between London, New York and West Cork in the south west of Ireland.

Career
Born in Cork, Ireland on 10 June 1952, Bob Crowley is the brother of director John Crowley. He trained at the Bristol Old Vic Theatre School. He has designed over 20 productions for the National Theatre including Ghetto, The Madness of George III, Carousel and The History Boys. He has also designed numerous productions for the Royal Shakespeare Company including The Plantagenets, for which he won an Olivier award, and Les Liaisons Dangereuses, which later had a successful run in London, followed by a transfer to Broadway.  Opera productions include the critically acclaimed production of The Magic Flute directed by Nicholas Hytner for the English National Opera and La Traviata for the Royal Opera House.

Crowley is a frequent collaborator with Nicholas Hytner, and as well as on Broadway has worked extensively at the Royal National Theatre in London and with England's Royal Shakespeare Company.

Bob Crowley has received multiple Tony Award nominations, and has won seven times, for designing the Broadway productions of Carousel (1994), Aida (2000), The History Boys (2006), Mary Poppins (2007), The Coast of Utopia (2007), Once (2012) and An American in Paris (2015).  He received three other Tony Award nominations in 2015, two for his costumes on The Audience and An American in Paris and one for his scenic designs for Skylight. He is a two-time recipient of the Laurence Olivier Award for Best Set Design and a three-time recipient of the Drama Desk Award for Outstanding Set Design.

Crowley designed set and costume for Mary Poppins, which played in both the West End and on Broadway. He designed and directed the Phil Collins musical Tarzan. He is the set and costume designer for Andrew Lloyd Webber's Love Never Dies, and the costume designer of the 2012 European version of The Little Mermaid. In 2015 he has designed for three Broadway shows, The Audience, An American in Paris, and Skylight.

Awards and nominations

References

External links

1952 births
Living people
People from Cork (city)
Alumni of Bristol Old Vic Theatre School
Irish theatre directors
Irish scenic designers
Irish costume designers
Tony Award winners
Drama Desk Award winners
Laurence Olivier Award winners